Elly Van Gelderen (born September 20, 1958 in Geertruidenberg, The Netherlands) is a syntactician, and is especially interested in how languages change. Elly is the author of eleven books and eighty or so articles in journals such as Linguistic Analysis and Studia Linguistica. Elly has also taught at Arizona State University as an English professor since 1995.

Most cited books 
Van Gelderen E.  History of the English Language,   (cited 560 times according to Google Scholar)
Van Gelderen E. An introduction to the grammar of English. An Introduction to the Grammar of English. 2010 
Van Gelderen E. Grammaticalization as economy.. 2004 (Cited 654 times 
Van Gelderen E. The linguistic cycle: Language change and the language faculty. Oxford University Press; 2011 (Cited 459 times )
Van Gelderen E. The rise of functional categories. J. Benjamins; 1993   (Cited 241 times )
van Gelderen E. Syntax: An introduction to minimalism. John Benjamins Publishing Company; 2017

References

External links

Syntacticians
1958 births
Living people